The following table is a season-by-season summary of league performances for Dundee United.

Key

Pre-War

War
The Second World War saw the suspension of the major tournaments, with regional tournaments going ahead. Dundee United played in the North Eastern League, which consisted of autumn and season league and cup tournaments. In 1945–56, United played in the Southern League and corresponding league cup tournament.

Post-War

Sources:
 LondonHearts.com

References

External links
 Official club website history

 
  

Seasons
 
Dundee United
Seasons